The Tampere light rail, branded as Tampere Tram, is a public transport system in Tampere, Finland. In November 2016, the Tampere city council approved plans to construct a 330-million-euro light rail system on the route from the city centre to Hervanta and to the Tampere University Hospital. Traffic on the first two lines of the route (lines 1 and 3) began on 9 August 2021.

An extension from the city centre to Lentävänniemi is also under construction. It is aimed to be finished in 2024. Along the route to Lentävänniemi, an artificial island called Näsisaari ("Näsi Island") near the shore of Lake Näsijärvi is also under construction, and it is planned to be mainly serve the structure of light rail. The first phase of the extension from Pyynikintori to Santalahti is scheduled to open in 2023.

Unlike Turku, another Finnish city that is planning a new light rail system (see Turku light rail), Tampere had not had a previously existing tram or light rail system. The construction of a tram system in Tampere was seriously studied between the years 1907 and 1929, but left unrealised due to the high price of constructing such a system.

Tampere is the fourth city in Finland to have a tram system but one of only two to still have trams in service, as Turku discontinued tram service in 1972 and Vyborg (already part of the Soviet Union at the time) did so in 1957.

Traffic

After negotiations, the VR Group was chosen as the operator of the Tampere light rail in 2019. The agreement includes traffic operations and traffic direction. The company Tampereen Raitiotie Oy (TRO), owned by the city of Tampere, is responsible for the vehicle stock and infrastructure. The traffic is commissioned by the Tampere Regional Transport Authority. Commercial test traffic started on 10 May 2021 and traffic proper started on 9 August 2021.

Lines

At the start of operations, the Tampere light rail operates two lines, 1 and 3. The numbering of the lines is in accordance with the rest of the public transport in Tampere, so that line numbers between trams and buses do not collide. Line 3 replaces the old bus lines 3 and 4 and travels from Pyynikki via Sammonaukio, Hakametsä and Hervanta to Hervantajärvi. Line 1, formed from the middle part of the old bus line 1, starts from Sorin aukio and travels along line 3 from Koskipuisto to Sammonaukio, where it branches off via the Tampere University Hospital to Kauppi. Both lines have several exchange stops where it is possible to switch lines on the same platform. The travel time from Pyynikki to Hervantajärvi is about 29 minutes. The time between trams is 3 to 4 minutes on the common route and 7.5 minutes elsewhere.

Rolling stock

After a bidding contest, the Kajaani-based company Škoda Transtech was chosen as the provider of the vehicle stock in October 2016. A competing provider complained to the market court about this decision, where the complaint was rejected in October 2017. After this Transtech and the city of Tampere signed an agreement about delivery of the tram vehicles (Artic X34). The design of the trams was finalized in 2018.

In the first stage 19 vehicles were delivered and 5 to 6 more vehicles were delivered in the second stage. The agreement includes an option for an additional 46 vehicles (after the first 19 vehicles), to provide for further expansion of the light rail. The first vehicles were test driven in 2020. The order for the first and second stages includes 26 vehicles in total. The price per vehicle is 3.2 to 3.8 million euro and the price for the entire order is about 97.5 million euro.

The model of the Tampere tram is ForCity Smart Artic X34 and they are 37.3 metres long, low-floored and drivable in both directions. The agreement about the vehicles includes an option to lengthen the vehicles to 47 metres. The industrial design company Idis Design was chosen as the designer of the vehicles in January 2018. The main solutions for the vehicles were designed in early 2018 after which the design was improved by constructing a life-size model tram vehicle to describe the details of the design. The first raw model tram was completed in March 2018 and the finalised model was presented to the citizens of Tampere in February 2019. Transtech started construction of the vehicles in Otanmäki in Kajaani in October 2018; the first vehicle was completed and delivered to Tampere in May 2020. Already in February 2020 Transtech had provided a TW 6000 tram from 1981 to Tampere as a test vehicle.

The vehicles have space for 264 passengers, of which 104 are seating places. The top traffic speed is 70 kilometres per hour; the average speed is 19 to 22 kilometres per hour. Movement between the platform and the tram is level and accessible. The final design and colouring of the trams were announced in October 2018, with brick red chosen as the main colour of the trams.

History

1907–1929: tram system planning
The first official plans for a tram system in Tampere were made in 1907, when a committee was formed to study the construction of the tram system. The study, completed in 1909, found the construction of a tram system relatively expensive, but during the first years of the next decade, it seemed that Tampere would get a tram system. Eventually, the plans were shelved due to World War I. Around the same time, plans for tram systems were also made in other Finnish cities: Turku tram was opened in 1908, Vyborg tram in 1912, while Lahti (1907–17) and Riihimäki (1922) also made serious studies into the matter, though their systems, too, were left unbuilt. After the war, subsequent plans for a tram system in Tampere were made as late as 1929, but these, again, were not realised.

2001–2004: TramTrain proposal
The construction of a light rail system for Tampere had been discussed since the 1970s, but the decision-makers of the city were hesitant to make any decisions without collaboration with other cities in Finland to keep down costs. In 2001, the city took the initiative in planning a light rail network when a rail traffic project group was formed to study the construction of such a system by the Finnish Ministry of Traffic & Communication, VR Group and various cities in the Greater Tampere area. The group completed its work in 2004, recommending a tram-train system utilising pre-existing railroad sections, newly built track and a tunnel section under central Tampere to avoid traffic jams. The proposed system was named TamTrain as a pun on Tram-Train.

The TamTrain proposal created some criticism as existing urban areas in the region are around major roads, not railroads, and the proposed system would have, in fact, worsened public transport connections in many areas. The tunnel under the center of the city was also found problematic, as constructing such a tunnel would have forced the light rail lines to completely bypass important traffic hubs such as TAYS (Tampere University Hospital). Additionally, the  tunnel section, which would have included only three stops, would have constituted 29% of the total price of the  system.

TASE 2025 light rail plan
The intermediary TASE 2025 report published in 2007 recommended the creation of a light rail system running alongside major roads linking central Tampere to the suburbs of Vuores and Hervanta in phase 1 (by 2015), Lielahti and Lentävänniemi in phase 2 (2015–25), with links to Koilliskeskus, Ojala-Lamminrahka and Pirkkala in phase 3 (after 2025). There are also plans to continue light rail to the town of Ylöjärvi. In addition to the light rail system, the study recommended the creation of a commuter rail line utilising pre-existing railroad lines as well as improvements into pre-existing bus connections in areas not covered by either rail option. According to these recommendations, the initial parts of the light rail system would be opened in 2015. Although technically a light rail system, the system proposed in TASE 2025 is referred to in Finnish as katuraitiotie, "street tramway", as opposed to the term pikaraitiotie, literally "rapid tramway", which is a commonly used word for all kinds of light rail systems in Finnish, but which has been used almost exclusively for TramTrain-esque systems with a tunnel in the city centre in Tampere.

The total cost of the system would be €298 million. The light rail system is projected to make approximately €10 million of yearly profit, whereas the current all-bus based system generates average losses of €10 million every year. A subsequent intermediary report submitted on 5 March 2009 proposed four different alternatives for the future development of public transport in Tampere, all of which included the realisation of a light rail system. The initial phase in all four alternatives was the same, but the precise routes and lengths of the subsequent extensions were different.

Operations 
The light rail began operating in August 2021. In the first year of operations, around 10 million trips were made using the system, accounting for around a quarter of all public transport trips during the period.

Construction
The city of Tampere asked for tenders from consultants with experience in designing light rail/tram systems during the summer of 2010. The deadline for submitting tenders was on 16 August 2010, after which a consultant was chosen. The plan was that the consultant's report should be ready by the end of April 2011, after which the city council will make the decision on whether or not to proceed with the construction of a light rail system.

A final decision was made in the city council on 7 November 2016 to start construction and to purchase trams. The tram supplier will be Transtech, a Finnish subsidiary of Škoda Transportation. The rail gauge is 1435 mm, which makes vehicle purchase easier, because producers generally have developed trams for this gauge. Construction commenced in 2017 and the first phase (city centre to TAYS and Hervanta) was opened in 2021. The cost, including rolling stock, was estimated at €330 million. After construction of the first phase was completed, the Tampere municipal council announced that the final cost of the project was €34 million under the revised budget of €300 million.

Keolis, Länsilinjat and VR were shortlisted to operate the tramway, with the contract awarded to VR in April 2019 for a period of 10 years, with an option to extend for a further three years.

References

External links
Builders website (construction information and updates)

Tram transport in Finland
Transport in Tampere
Light rail in Finland
Railway lines opened in 2021